Chip Baltimore is an American attorney and politician who served as a member of the Iowa House of Representatives from 2011 to 2019.

Early life and education 
Baltimore was born in Oskaloosa, Iowa in 1966. He was raised on a farm with his two siblings. After graduating from Oskaloosa Senior High School in 1984, he earned a Bachelor of Business Administration degree in finance and economics from Iowa State University and a Juris Doctor from the University of Minnesota Law School.

Career 
For most of his legal career he has practiced law in Boone, Iowa. Baltimore was first elected to the Iowa House of Representatives in 2010.

Baltimore served on several committees in the Iowa House, including the Commerce and Ways and Means committees, as well as the Justice Systems Appropriations Budget Subcommittee. He formerly served as the chair of the House Judiciary Committee. Baltimore did not seek re-election in 2018 and left office in January 2019.

References

External links

 Iowa Republicans bio of Baltimore
 Iowa Legislature bio of Baltimore

1966 births
Iowa State University alumni
University of Minnesota Law School alumni
Iowa lawyers
Republican Party members of the Iowa House of Representatives
Living people
People from Oskaloosa, Iowa
People from Boone, Iowa
21st-century American politicians